The Rioli family are a notable Australian rules football family from the Tiwi Islands in the Northern Territory.

Six family members have played in the Australian Football League (AFL), with a further five playing in the West Australian Football League for South Fremantle. Many more family members have played for the Tiwi Bombers or St Mary's in the Northern Territory Football League (NTFL) and the Northern Territory Thunder in the North East Australian Football League (NEAFL). Nineteen members of the family have played a combined total of more than 1000 games for St Mary's. Cyril Senior (7 July 1934 – 3 June 2014) was awarded an Order of Australia Medal in 2014 for services to develop the Tiwi Island community.

Sebastian (Sibby) Rioli (17 Jan 1954 – 3 May 2012): South Fremantle (1972–1976)
Maurice Rioli (1957–2010): South Fremantle (1975–1981,1988–1990), Richmond (1982–1987)
John Rioli: South Fremantle colts Jack Clarke Medal 1982
Cyril Rioli Jr: South Fremantle (1987) 
Willie Rioli Sr (21 Feb 1972 – 12 July 2022): South Fremantle (1989–1990, 1994)
Dean Rioli (born 1978): South Fremantle (1995–1997), Essendon (1999–2006)
Cyril Rioli (born 1989): Hawthorn (2008–2018)
Daniel Rioli (born 1997): Richmond (2016–)
Junior Rioli (born 1995): West Coast (2018–2022), Port Adelaide (2023–)
Ben Rioli (born 1993): South Fremantle (2020–)
Maurice Rioli Jr (born 2002): Richmond (2021–)

Michael Long, Benny Vigona, and current AFL Women's player Danielle Ponter are also related to the Rioli family by marriage.

See also
Riolo (disambiguation)

References

Lists of people by surname
Rioli family
Australian rules football in the Northern Territory
Tiwi Islands people